Anna Lapwood (born 28 July 1995) is an organist, conductor and television and radio presenter, currently Director of Music at and Fellow of Pembroke College, Cambridge. On appointment she was the youngest person to hold the position of Director of Music at an Oxbridge college, taking up the position at the age of 21. As a broadcaster, Lapwood hosted a weekly classical music show on BBC Radio Cambridgeshire from 2018 to 2020, and is a contributor to BBC Radio 3, having appeared on Record Review with Andrew McGregor. Because of her popularity on social media, she has occasionally been referred to as the "TikTok Organist" and uses the hashtag #playlikeagirl.

Education
After completing her A-levels at Oxford High School, Lapwood gained a first-class degree from Magdalen College, Oxford, and was the first woman in the college's 560-year history to be awarded an organ scholarship.

Pembroke College, Cambridge
As Director of Music, Lapwood conducts the Chapel Choir at Pembroke College, Cambridge. In January 2020, she was appointed Bye-Fellow of the college, the youngest in the college's history.

In 2018, Lapwood founded the Pembroke College Girls’ Choir, for girls aged 11–18 from local schools and which performs evensong weekly during term time. She also runs the Cambridge Organ Experience for Girls every year. Lapwood has been running the Pembroke College Bach-a-thon each year since 2017, initially to raise funds for Pembroke College Choir's tour to Zambia. In 2018, all of the organists taking part in the Bach-a-thon were female. In 2019, Lapwood established another choir at Pembroke College, designed to teach sight-reading skills to singers.

On 15 December 2019, Lapwood and the choirs of Pembroke College appeared on BBC One's show Britain's Christmas Story, presented by Gareth Malone and Karen Gibson.

Music career
Lapwood studied piano, violin, viola and composition at the Junior Royal Academy of Music and was the principal harpist for the National Youth Orchestra of Great Britain and the Junior Academy Symphony Orchestra. As an organist, Lapwood has performed in the Royal Albert Hall, the Royal Festival Hall and St Thomas Church, New York. In 2019, Lapwood opened the BAFTA TV awards on the organ at the Royal Festival Hall, and she frequently travels the UK and Europe on tours.

As a conductor, Lapwood directed the BBC Singers as part of the BBC Inspire Programme. She has led choral workshops in Thailand, Perth, Shenzen, Shanghai, and Lusaka, and regularly works in Zambia through her role as a trustee of The Muze Trust.

As a singer, Lapwood has released two albums as part of Gareth Malone's professional ensemble Voices. With the ensemble, she has performed at the Classical Brit Awards, Royal Variety Show, and the National Eisteddfod of Wales, among other TV performances.

Lapwood was the main presenter of the televised highlights of the 2020 BBC Young Musician competition, which aired in 2021 due to the global COVID-19 pandemic.

In 2022, she was named an Associate Artist at the Royal Albert Hall, and an Ambassador for the Cathedral Music Trust (alongside Alexander Armstrong.)

Collaboration with Bonobo
In May 2022, Lapwood was unexpectedly invited to play with the electronic artist Bonobo and his band on their fifth and final night at The Royal Albert Hall.  After band members overheard Lapwood rehearsing on the hall's main organ in the early hours of Friday morning, the band asked Lapwood to join in their performance the next day. Eighteen hours later, an organ part had been written especially for Lapwood to accompany Bonobo for the closing show with an audience of 5,000. The video of the performance became popular on social media platforms, registering more than 5.6 million views on Lapwood's TikTok account.

Anna later said of the experience, “Every now and then you play a concert that feels genuinely life-changing. This was that concert for me.” In her YouTube post, she said, "This was, undoubtedly, the best moment of my life so far!"

References

External links

Living people
English classical organists
Women organists
Alumni of Magdalen College, Oxford
People educated at Oxford High School, England
Fellows of Pembroke College, Cambridge
21st-century organists
21st-century English women musicians
21st-century British conductors (music)
English choral conductors
Women conductors (music)
1995 births